The Animal Kingdom (also known as The Woman in His House in the UK) is a 1932 American pre-Code comedy-drama film  directed by Edward H. Griffith based upon a comedy of manners play of the same name by Philip Barry. The film stars Leslie Howard, Ann Harding, Myrna Loy, William Gargan, Ilka Chase, and Neil Hamilton. Howard, Gargan, and Chase also starred in the play when it opened on Broadway on January 12, 1932. It was remade 1946 as One More Tomorrow.

Plot 

Tom Collier  owns a small press that publishes deluxe books. He has been living in the city with his best friend and lover Daisy Sage without being married. Daisy is a successful commercial artist for a fashion magazine. She has just returned from three months in Paris. While Daisy was away, Tom has fallen in love with Cecelia Henry.

Tom's wealthy banker father, Rufus Collier, describes his lifelong frustration with his son to Cecelia and Owen Fiske, a family friend and attorney. Tom has had every advantage, including education at both Harvard and Oxford, and a position at the bank, yet he is an idler and his friends are uncouth. His father is now afraid that Tom might actually marry Daisy.  Cecelia reassures him on that score: She is going to marry Tom in June. Owen is surprised and crushed—he thought that she loved him—but Tom's father doesn't notice and approves wholeheartedly.

Tom tells Daisy of his impending marriage. He assures her that nothing between them need change, but Daisy grows angry and sends him away, saying "Good-Bye...’til Doomsday". Soon, Cecelia has persuaded Tom to publish a book that is "the worst tripe" that his press has ever published, but it sells wonderfully. She talks him into publishing bad books that will make money and getting rid of his old friends, including "Red", his prize-fighter friend and butler. She wants Tom to sell his publishing company, live in the city with his father as a "proper gentleman" and take their place in society, a prospect that Tom has been resisting all his life.

Daisy tries to stay away, but she and Tom's Bohemian friends can't believe he's happy. She loves him deeply and wants to have children with him, but cares most about his well-being. Tom complains that he's losing his soul and integrity. Finally, when Cecelia offers Tom champagne to toast selling his publishing company and moving in with his father, Tom realizes that Cecelia's bedroom suite reminds him of a brothel he used to visit, as he says, "in vino veritas". When Red tells Tom he is going back to the city, that he can't stomach being at that house any longer, Tom insists on driving him to the station, saying, "I'm going back to my wife", referring to Daisy. As he leaves, he signs over to Cecelia a large birthday check from his father, and puts it on the mantle, just as he used to leave money for the girls in the bordello.

Cast
 Ann Harding as Daisy Sage, illustrator and artist
 Leslie Howard as Tom Collier
 Myrna Loy as Mrs. Cecelia 'Cee' Thomas Collier
 William Gargan as 'Red' Regan, Tom's Butler
 Neil Hamilton as Owen, a lawyer
 Ilka Chase as Grace - Cee's Friend
 Henry Stephenson as Mr Rufus Collier
 Leni Stengel as Franc Schmidt, Cellist, and Daisy's friend
 Don Dillaway as Joe Fiske - One Of Tom's Authors

Production

Writing
The film is based on a 1932 play of the same name set in 1930s New York and Connecticut. Although the play emphasizes the estrangement between Tom and his father, who has never visited his son's house, before; and that Owen, his one "respectable gentleman" friend, introduced Cecelia to Tom, these two elements are not as significant in the film.

Development
Although RKO originally purchased the film rights to The Animal Kingdom as a vehicle for Ann Harding, Irene Dunne was substituted when scheduling conflicts arose with Harding. In an ironic twist, when filming of Smilin' Through did not finish on time and MGM refused to release Leslie Howard to RKO to begin filming The Animal Kingdom at the scheduled time, RKO realized Ann Harding would now be available and reassigned her to the rôle.

Reception
According to RKO records the film had a loss of $110,000 during its first year of release, in 1932–33.

Legacy
In 1960, the film entered the public domain in the United States because the claimants did not renew its copyright registration in the 28th year after publication.

The film was preserved by the UCLA Film & Television Archive in 1985. (Source: UCLA Archive website)

Rare home movie footage taken on set during the production by co-star Leslie Howard and featuring candid footage of Ann Harding, Myrna Loy, William Gargan and director Edward H Griffith is included in the 2016 documentary  Leslie Howard: The Man Who Gave a Damn

References

External links

 
 
 
 
 
 

1932 films
1932 comedy-drama films
American comedy-drama films
American black-and-white films
Articles containing video clips
Films scored by Max Steiner
American films based on plays
Films directed by Edward H. Griffith
Films produced by David O. Selznick
RKO Pictures films
1930s English-language films
1930s American films